Matthew Keating (23 May 1869 – 25 May 1937) was an Irish politician. He was born at Mountain Ash, South Wales, the second son of Cornelius Keating, a native of Cahirciveen, Co. Kerry. He was educated at the local Catholic Elementary School and became a miner at Nixon's Navigation Colliery. He later entered into business at Cardiff, and at Newport. He relocated to London in 1898.

Keating was elected unopposed as Irish Nationalist Member of Parliament for South Kilkenny in a 1909 by-election, after the previous holder, Nicholas Joseph Murphy, was declared bankrupt. Keating held the seat until the 1918 general election, when he was defeated by the Sinn Féin candidate and former MP for South Kilkenny, James O'Mara by 8,685 votes to 1,855.

After his time in Parliament, Keating took a keen interest in literary affairs. He eventually was made Fellow of the Royal Statistical Society. He served also as a director of Irish Shell Ltd.

In 1913 Keating married Hannah Sweeney, of Gore, New Zealand, whose family were from County Donegal. He died at his home at Cricklewood, London.

References

Irish Independent, 26 May 1937
Irish Press, 26 May 1937
Brian M. Walker (ed.), Parliamentary Election Results in Ireland, 1801-1922, Dublin, Royal Irish Academy, 1978

External links
 Matthew Keating’s main page on the House of Commons Hansard website

1869 births
Members of the Parliament of the United Kingdom for County Kilkenny constituencies (1801–1922)
UK MPs 1906–1910
UK MPs 1910
UK MPs 1910–1918
Fellows of the Royal Statistical Society
1937 deaths
Irish Parliamentary Party MPs